The Groote Kerk (Afrikaans and Dutch for "Great Church") is a Dutch Reformed church in Cape Town, South Africa. The church is South Africa's oldest place of Christian worship, built by Herman Schuette in 1841. The first church on this land was built in 1678. Willem Adriaan van der Stel laid the cornerstone for the church. It was replaced by the present building in 1841, but the original tower was retained. The pulpit is the work of Anton Anreith and the carpenter Jacob Graaff, and was inaugurated on 29 November 1789. The Groote Kerk lays claim to housing South Africa's largest organ, which was installed in 1954 and has 5917 pipes.

Background 
At first the colonists, landing beginning in 1652 at the Cape of Good Hope, relied on a lay preacher (sieketrooster, Dutch for "comforter of the ill") named Willem Wylant. He regularly preached in the Fort, taught children, and evangelized to natives. The first communion was held on May 12, 1652, by a visiting pastor, the Rev. Johannes Backerus, while the first baptism was held on August 24, 1653. Other sieketroosters who served the community were Pieter van der Stael, Ernestus Back, and Jan Joris Graaf.

Early pastors 
The small congregation longed for its own preacher, until the Lord's Seventeen of the Dutch East India Company in Amsterdam decided to send the first full-time pastor to the Cape. He was Joan van Arckel, who landed at Table Bay on August 18, 1665. During his tenure, he used a wooden church that was supplied in December of that same year with a stone gable and floor. In 1672, services began to be held in "De Kat" (Afrikaans for "The Cat"), a section of the Castle of Good Hope, since the foundations of the first church building would not be laid until 1678. On January 6, 1704, the first stone church opened with a service by the Rev. Petrus Kalden. Construction cost £2,200.

The first Afrikaner (i.e. local-born) pastor of the congregation was the Rev. Petrus van der Spuy (1746-1752). During the tenure of the Rev. Johannes Petrus Serrurier (1760-1802), the 1704 church was slated for expansion. This was completed at a cost of 4,000 and opened in 1781. The current pulpit, made from the best Indian wood at the cost of £708 by the sculptor Anton Anreith, was unveiled in November 1789. Later, the building was damaged, and the current Groote Kerk was opened in 1841.

One of the most famous pastors in the congregation's history was the Rev. Abraham Faure, who served the congregation from 1822 to 1867. He showed particular interest in education, and his efforts were instrumental to founding the first local Sunday school in 1844.

Another famous 19th-century pastor was Dr. William Robertson (Scottish minister), who came here from Swellendam.

Large church, small congregation 
Some of the neighborhoods got their own ministers and therefore separate congregations: Three Anchor Bay Reformed Church (in Sea Point), Observatory Reformed Church, Woodstock Reformed Church, and Maitland Reformed Church, while the Table Mountain Reformed Church was spun off from the Tamboerskloof Reformed Church (also called the New Church). As Afrikaners have left the area, the daughter congregations have tended to decline in number. Woodstock latter dissolved, and in 2007, Three Anchor Bay, Observatory, Maitland, and Tamboerskloof had only 659 members among all four congregations combined, down to 646 in 2008, compared to 1,816 for them plus Woodstock in 1985.

In 1952, celebrated as the congregation's tricentennial (later, the foundation was more correctly rendered as 1665), there were more than 2,000 members served by three pastors in the mother church. In 1979, there were still 1,971 adult members, but by 1995 that number had shrunk to 1,403, and by 2009 it reached a mere 810. At the end of 2014 it had declined to 585.

List of ministers

 Joan van Arckel, 1665 - January 12, 1666 (died in office)
 Johannes de Vooght, February 26 to November 23, 1666
 Petrus Wachtendorp, November 1666 - December 15, 1667 (died in office)
 Adriaan de Vooght, 1667 - 1674
 Rudolpus Meerlandt, 1674 - 1675
 Petrus Hulsenaar, 1675 - 1677
 Johan Frederick Stumphius, May 1678 (not on the official church list)
 Johannes Overney, 1678 - 1687
 Johannes van Andel, 1687 - 1689 (returned to Batavia)
 Leonardus Terwoldt, 1689 - 1695 (returned to Batavia
 Hercules van Loon, 1695 - 1697
 Petrus Kalden, 1697 - 1708 (returned to Holland)
 Engelbertus Franciscus le Boucq, 1707 - 1708 (not on the official church list)
 Johannes Godefridus D'Ailly, 1708 - 1726
 Lambertus Slicher, 1723 - 1725
 Hendrik Beck, 1726 - 1731
 Franciscus le Seuer, 1729 - 1746
 Henricus Cock, 1732 - 1743
 Ruardus van Cloppenburgh, 1746 - 1748 (returned to Holland, died in 1751)
 Petrus van der Spuy, 1746 - 1752 (first South-African-born pastor)
 Henricus Kronenburg, 1752 - 1779 (27 years; retired; died the latter year)
 Gerhardus Croeser, 1754 - 1755
 Christiaan Benjamin Voltelen, 1755 - 1758
 Johannes Frederik Bode, 1758 - 1760
 Johannes Petrus Serrurier, 1760 - 1802 (47 years; retired; died February 3, 1819)
 Christiaan Fleck, 1781 - 1822 (41 years)
 Meent Borcherds, 1785 - 1786
 Helperus Ritzema van Lier, 1786 - 1793
 Abraham Kuys, 1794 - 1799
 Johan Heinrich von Manger, 1802 - 1839 (37 years; retired; died May 2, 1842)
 Johannes Christoffel Berrange, 1817 - 1827
 Dr. Abraham Faure, 1822 - 1867 (45 years)
 Johannes Spijker, 1834 - 1864 (30 years; retired; died May 21, 1865)
 Stephanus Petrus Heyns, 1839 - September 17, 1873 (36 years; died in office)
 Dr. Andrew Murray, 1864 - 1871
 Georg Stegmann jr., 1867 - 1880
 Gilles van de Wall, 1874 - 1875
 Anton Daniël Lückhoff, 1875 - 1886 (New Church, later Tamboerskloof)
 Dr. Johannes Jacobus Kotzé, 1880 - 1899
 Abraham Isaac Steytler, 1881 - 1915 (34 years; retired; died December 17, 1922)
 Christoffel Frederic Jacobus Muller, 1887 - 1890 (New Church, later Tamboerskloof)
 Adriaan Moorrees, 1892 - 1895
 Charles Morgan (South Africa), 1893 - 1896 (Robben Island)
 Francis Xavier Roome, 1895 - 1937 (Sea Point, 42 years)
 Zacharia Johannes de Beer, 1895 - 1923 (Woodstock, until foundation of separate congregation, 28 years)
 Louis Hugo, 1897 - 1907 (Robben Island)
 Dr. Johannes Petrus van Heerden, 1899 - 1935 (36 years)
 Dr. Johannes du Plessis, 1899 - 1903 (Sea Point)
 Dr. Barend Johannes Haarhoff, 1905 - 1912 (Maitland, until foundation of separate congregation)
 Gerrit Johannes du Plessis, 1906 - 1912 (Observatory, until foundation of separate congregation)
 Johannes Stephanus Hauman, 1908 - 1918 (retired; died July 24, 1925; Robben Island)
 Daniel Gerhardus Malan, 1918 - 1921
 Pieter Basson Ackermann, 1918 - 1922 (Robben Island)
 Daniel Stephanus Burger Joubert, 1921 - 1925
 Willem Ferdinand Louw, 1922 - 1929 (Robben Island; retired; died August 16, 1933)
 Dr. Abraham van der Merwe, 1926 - 1966 (40 years)
 Jacobus Delarey Conradie, 1936 - 1967 (31 years)
 Pieter du Toit, 1938 - 1943
 Theunis Christoffel Botha Stofberg, 1940 – 1944 (student pastor)
 Johannes Gerhardus Janse van Vuuren, 1945 - 1954, December 7, 1963 - April 9, 1986 (32 years)
 Willem Adolf Landman, 1958 - January 29, 1979 (director of the Information Bureau; 21 years)
 Petrus Andries van Zyl, 1958 - 1960 (traveling missionary)
 Johannes Mattheus Delport, 1960 - 1963
 Jacobus van der Westhuizen, 1968 - 1997 (29 years)
 Erasmus Adriaan van Niekerk, 1972 - 1975
 Abraham Johannes Prins, 1975 - 1981
 Petrus Johannes Botes, April 26, 1981 - 2009 (28 years)
 Gideon de Wit, 2003 - 2015
 Johan Taute van Rooyen, 2011 - 2018
 Riaan de Villiers, 2014–present
 Michiel Strauss, 2019–present

Bibliography 
 Maeder, Rev. G.A. and Zinn, Christian. 1917. Ons Kerk Album. Cape Town: Ons Kerk Album Maatschappij Bpkt.
 Olivier, rev. P.L. (compiler). 1952. Ons gemeentelike feesalbum. Cape Town/Pretoria: N.G. Kerk-uitgewers.

External links

 
 
 (af) Die gemeente vier sy 350-jarige bestaan. URL accessed 27 January 2015.

Churches in Cape Town
Churches completed in 1841
Dutch Reformed Church buildings
1678 establishments in the Dutch Empire
Neoclassical church buildings in South Africa
19th-century religious buildings and structures in South Africa